The men's high jump event  at the 1998 European Athletics Indoor Championships was held on 27 February–1 March.

Medalists

Results

Qualification
Qualification performance: 2.24 (Q) or at least 12 best performers (q) advanced to the final.

Final

References

Qualification results
Final results

High jump at the European Athletics Indoor Championships
High